James Whitlock may refer to:
 James E. Whitlock (born 1934), member of the Kentucky House of Representatives
 James H. Whitlock (1829–1901), member of the California legislature